William Hickman may refer to:
 Wild Bill Hickman (William Adams Hickman, 1815–1883), frontiersman in the American West
 Bill Hickman (William Hickman, 1921–1986), stunt driver/actor
 William Edward Hickman (1908–1928), American criminal
 Sir William Hickman, 2nd Baronet (1629–1682), English politician
 W. Albert Hickman (1878–1957), Canadian designer and manufacturer of fast boats